Giuseppe Faraon (died 1588) was a Roman Catholic prelate who served as Bishop of Crotone (1581–1588) and Bishop of Massa Lubrense (1577–1581).

Biography
On 9 March 1577, Giuseppe Faraon was appointed during the papacy of Pope Gregory XIII as Bishop of Massa Lubrense.
On 26 November 1581, he was appointed during the papacy of Pope Gregory XIII as Bishop of Crotone. 
He served as Bishop of Crotone until his death in 1588.

See also
Catholic Church in Italy

References

External links and additional sources
 (for Chronology of Bishops) 
 (for Chronology of Bishops) 
 (for Chronology of Bishops) 
 (for Chronology of Bishops) 

16th-century Italian Roman Catholic bishops
Bishops appointed by Pope Gregory XII
1588 deaths